Stoneham is a surname. Notable people with the surname include:

 Barry Stoneham, Australian rules footballer
 Ben Stoneham, Baron Stoneham of Droxford, British politician
 Bill Stoneham, American artist and writer
 Charles Stoneham, financier and owner of the New York Giants
 Clive Stoneham, Australian politician
 Horace Stoneham, owner of the New York/San Francisco Giants and son of Charles Stoneham
 Tom Stoneham, Professor of Philosophy at the University of York